The Post Card: From Socrates to Freud and Beyond is a 1980 book by the French philosopher Jacques Derrida. It is a "satire of epistolary literature." After Glas (1974), it is sometimes considered Derrida's most "literary" book, and continues the critical engagement with psychoanalysis first signaled in "Freud and the Scene of Writing" from Derrida's Writing and Difference (1967).

Summary
The first half of the book, titled Envois (sendings), contains a series of love letters addressed by Derrida to an unnamed loved one. In one of the letters, dated 6 June 1977, Derrida tells about his time spent in London with Jonathan Culler and Cynthia Chase, who had recently married. They showed Derrida an exposition of hundreds of card reproductions, among which was the medieval depiction of Socrates taking dictation from Plato, which seized Derrida's attention by its reversal of the historical relationship between the two figures (since Socrates himself left behind no written texts). After describing Plato's posture in the picture, and speculating about what he may have been doing behind Socrates's back (riding a skateboard, conducting a tram), Derrida says

Envois is followed by:
 To Speculate - On Freud, an extended commentary on Beyond the Pleasure Principle
 Le Facteur de la Verité (the maker of truth), a critique of Lacanian psychoanalysis focusing on an analysis of Lacan's Edgar Allan Poe commentary, the "Seminar on 'The Purloined Letter'"
 and Du Tout (on the whole), a response to questions posed by the psychoanalyst René Major concerning Glas and Derrida's general relation to psychoanalytic theory.

In 2014 a feature film based on the book was released. Love in the Post is directed by Joanna Callaghan and co-written by Martin McQuillan and produced by Heraclitus Pictures. The film features an unseen interview with Derrida and contributions from Geoffrey Bennington, J. Hillis Miller, Sam  Weber, Ellen Burt and Catherine Malabou.

References

External links
 Love in the Post

1980 non-fiction books
Contemporary philosophical literature
French non-fiction books
Works by Jacques Derrida